The 2016–17 season is Millwall's 132nd year in existence, 91st consecutive season in The Football League and 43rd in the third tier. Along with competing in League One, the club participated in the FA Cup, League Cup and Football League Trophy. Millwall qualified for the playoffs for the second successive year, securing sixth place on the last day of the season in a 4–3 win away at Bristol Rovers. After beating Scunthorpe United 3–2 in the semi-final, Millwall gained promotion back to The Championship, beating Bradford City 1–0 in the final with a Steve Morison goal in the 85th minute.

Millwall also knocked out three Premier League teams on the way to reaching the FA Cup Quarter-final for the tenth time in their history, where they were knocked out by Tottenham. The season covers the period from 1 July 2016 to 30 June 2017.

Competitions

Pre-season friendlies

League One

League table

Results summary

Results by matchday

Matches

Play-offs

FA Cup

EFL Cup

EFL Trophy

Squad

Statistics

  

  
            

|-
|colspan=14|Out on Loan:

|}

Play-off Statistic

|}

Goals record

Disciplinary Record

Transfers

Transfers in

Transfers out

Loans in

Loans out

References

Millwall
Millwall F.C. seasons